Chico (variously Bag-o Sipol, Chico Islet or Maguho Islet) is an uninhabited island in northeastern Iloilo, Philippines. It is part of the municipality of Concepcion. The island is owned by the heirs of Consuelo and Zacarias Bagaforo of Malangabang Island.

Location and geography 

Chico Island is east of Panay Island in the Visayan Sea. Part of the Concepcion Islands, Chico is east of Sombrero Island and near Agho Island.

See also 

 List of islands in the Philippines
 List of islands
 Desert island

References

External links
 Chico Island at OpenStreetMap
 Concepcion Islands at Explore Iloilo

Islands of Iloilo
Uninhabited islands of the Philippines